Brittany Christine Bock (born April 11, 1987) is an American soccer midfielder.

Early life
Bock was born in Naperville, Illinois and attended Neuqua Valley High School.  In 2009, she was enrolled in the Mendoza College of Business at the University of Notre Dame, majoring in Marketing.

Bock played for Windy City Pride from 2002 to 2004 under Ko Thanadabouth.  Prior to that she played with Team Chicago Soccer Club under Hudson Fortune. In 2004 and 2005, she played for the Eclipse Select Soccer Club alongside future Notre Dame teammate Elise Weber.

University of Notre Dame
Bock became a highly influential player during her career at Notre Dame. In the 2006 NCAA Division 1 Women's Soccer National Finals, Notre Dame lost 2–1 to the University of North Carolina. Bock scored the only goal for the Irish in the 81st minute.

Club career

Los Angeles Sol
Bock was the fifth overall pick in the 2009 Women's Professional Soccer draft, going to Los Angeles Sol, becoming part of a defense that allowed a mere ten goals in twenty-one matches.

Washington Freedom
When the Sol folded in January 2010, Bock was drafted by the Washington Freedom in the ensuing 2010 Dispersal Draft.

Western New York Flash
In 2011, Bock was signed by the Western New York Flash.

Colorado Rush
In 2012 after the WPS suspended operations, Bock was signed by the Colorado Rush in the W-League. While with the Rush, she led the team in minutes playing 12 games and scoring four goals.

Sky Blue FC
On February 1, 2013 it was announced that Bock had agreed to terms and signed with Sky Blue FC of the National Women's Soccer League.

Houston Dash
On January 10, 2014, it was announced that the Houston Dash selected Bock with the first pick in the 2014 NWSL Expansion Draft. The move reunited her with former  Notre Dame coach Randy Waldrum.  She was injured in the Dash's inaugural game and was out for the rest of the season, then only saw five appearances the following year due to continuing injury issues.

She was waived by the Houston Dash in October 2015.

Chicago Red Stars
The Chicago Red Stars claimed Bock off waivers on October 21, 2015, and was picked up by Chicago Red Stars the next day; returning her to her hometown. However she was never added to the roster in 2016, and made no appearances for the club

International career
Bock was a member of the fourth-place United States U-20 women's national soccer team that competed at the 2006 FIFA U-20 Women's World Championship in Russia alongside Notre Dame classmate Carrie Dew.

In 2009 Bock was on the United States U-23 women's national soccer team player pool.

References

External links
 Brittany Bock profile at Houston Dash
 
 US Soccer player profile
 Los Angeles Sol player profile
 Notre Dame player profile

Notre Dame Fighting Irish women's soccer players
Los Angeles Sol players
Sportspeople from Naperville, Illinois
1987 births
Living people
Washington Freedom players
Western New York Flash players
Soccer players from Illinois
American women's soccer players
NJ/NY Gotham FC players
National Women's Soccer League players
Women's Professional Soccer players
Houston Dash players
Women's association football midfielders
United States women's under-20 international soccer players
F.C. Indiana players
Damallsvenskan players
Vittsjö GIK players
USL W-League (1995–2015) players
American expatriate sportspeople in Sweden
Expatriate women's footballers in Sweden
American expatriate women's soccer players
Chicago Red Stars players